Olenyok (Ölöön) is a rural locality (a selo) and the administrative center of Olenyoksky District in the Sakha Republic, Russia, located north of the Arctic Circle. Population:

Geography 
The village is located by the Olenyok River, a few miles downstream from the confluence of the Arga-Sala, its largest tributary.

Transportation
Olenyok is served by the Olenyok Airport .

Climate
Olenyok has a subarctic climate (Köppen climate classification Dfc). Precipitation is quite low, but is somewhat higher in summer than at other times of the year.

References

Notes

Sources
Official website of the Sakha Republic. Registry of the Administrative-Territorial Divisions of the Sakha Republic. Churapchinsky District. 

Rural localities in the Sakha Republic
Road-inaccessible communities of the Sakha Republic
Olenyok basin